Asymmetron is a genus of lancelets belonging to the family Branchiostomatidae.

The species of this genus are found in world oceans.

Species:

Asymmetron inferum 
Asymmetron lucayanum

References

Cephalochordata